BD−10°3166 is a K-type main sequence star approximately 268 light-years away in the constellation of Crater.  It was inconspicuous enough not be included in the Draper catalog (HD).  The Hipparcos satellite also did not study it, so its true distance is poorly known. The distance measured by the Gaia spacecraft of 268 light years rules out a suggested companion star, LP 731-076, being its true binary star companion.

Stellar characteristics
The star is very enriched with metals, being two to three times as metal-rich as the Sun. Planets are common around such stars, and BD−10°3166 is not an exception. In 2000, the California and Carnegie Planet Search team discovered an extrasolar planet orbiting the star.

Planetary system
In 2000, the California and Carnegie Planet Search discovered a hot Jupiter-type extrasolar planet that has a minimum mass less than half that of Jupiter's, and which takes only 3.49 days to revolve around BD−10°3166.

See also
 Lists of exoplanets

References

External links
 

Crater (constellation)
K-type main-sequence stars
Planetary systems with one confirmed planet
Durchmusterung objects